Michael Randall Mimbs (born February 13, 1969), is an American former professional baseball pitcher, who played in Major League Baseball (MLB) for the Philadelphia Phillies, from  to . He threw and batted left-handed.

Mimbs attended Mercer University, where he played college baseball for the Bears, under head coach Barry Myers.

External links

 Mike Mimbs at The Baseball Gauge
Mike Mimbs at Pura Pelota (Venezuelan Professional Baseball League)

1969 births
Living people
American expatriate baseball players in Canada
Baseball players from Georgia (U.S. state)
Columbus Clippers players
Great Falls Dodgers players
Harrisburg Senators players
Leones del Caracas players
American expatriate baseball players in Venezuela
Major League Baseball pitchers
Mercer Bears baseball players
Philadelphia Phillies players
San Antonio Missions players
Scranton/Wilkes-Barre Red Barons players
St. Paul Saints players
Vancouver Canadians players
Vero Beach Dodgers players
Yakima Bears players
American expatriate baseball players in Mexico
American expatriate baseball players in Taiwan
Sinon Bulls players